Religious epistemology as a broad label covers any approach to epistemological questions from a religious perspective, or attempts to understand the epistemological issues that come from religious belief. The questions which epistemologists may ask about any particular belief also apply to religious beliefs and propositions: whether they seem rational, justified, warranted, reasonable, based on evidence and so on. Religious views also influence epistemological theories, such as in the case of Reformed epistemology.

Reformed epistemology has developed in contemporary Christian religious epistemology, as in the work of Alvin Plantinga (born 1932), William P. Alston (1921-2009), Nicholas Wolterstorff (born 1932) and Kelly James Clark, as a critique of and alternative to the idea of "evidentialism" of the sort proposed by W. K. Clifford (1845-1879). Alvin Plantinga, for instance, is critical of the evidentialist analysis of knowledge provided by Richard Feldman and by Earl Conee.

D. Z. Phillips (1934-2006) takes this further and says that the argument of the reformed epistemologists goes further and challenges a view he dubs "foundationalism":

Much work in recent epistemology of religion goes beyond debates over foundationalism and reformed epistemology to consider contemporary issues deriving from social epistemology (especially concerning the epistemology of testimony, or the epistemology of disagreement), or formal epistemology's use of probability theory. Other notable work draws on the idea that knowing God is akin to knowing a person, which is not reducible to knowing propositions about a person.

Some work in recent epistemology of religion discusses various challenges from psychology, cognitive science or evolutionary biology to the rationality or justification of religious beliefs. Some argue that evolutionary explanations of religious belief undermine its rationality. Others responded to these arguments.

See also 

 Pramana
Faith and rationality
 Fideism
 Pascal's wager
 Reformed epistemology
 Skeptical theism

References

External links
 "Revitalizing the Epistemology of Religion". Oxford University Press blog, retrieved June 17, 2018.

Epistemology of religion